Czech Film Critics' Award for Best Actress in Leading Role was one of the awards given to the best Czech motion picture. It was discontinued in 2013.

Winners

References

External links

Film awards for lead actress
Czech Film Critics' Awards
Awards established in 2010